The 38th Academy Awards, honoring the best in film for 1965, were held on April 18, 1966, at the Santa Monica Civic Auditorium in Santa Monica, California.  They were hosted by Bob Hope, and were the first Oscars to be broadcast live in color. Lynda Bird Johnson, daughter of President Lyndon B. Johnson, attended the ceremony, escorted by actor George Hamilton.

The most successful films of the year were The Sound of Music and Doctor Zhivago, each with ten nominations and five wins, with the former winning Best Picture. Both films are in the top 10 inflation-adjusted  commercially successful films ever made, and both would go on to appear on the American Film Institute list of the greatest American films of the twentieth century.

The Sound of Music was the first Best Picture winner without a screenwriting nomination since Hamlet, and would be the last until Titanic at the 70th Academy Awards. Othello became the third film (of four to date) to receive four acting nominations without one for Best Picture. William Wyler received the last of his record twelve Best Director nominations for The Collector.

Awards

Nominees were announced on February 21, 1966. Winners are listed first and highlighted with boldface.

Honorary Award
 Bob Hope "for unique and distinguished service to our industry and the Academy".

Irving G. Thalberg Memorial Award
 William Wyler

Jean Hersholt Humanitarian Award
 Edmond L. DePatie

Multiple nominations and awards 

These films had multiple nominations:

10 nominations: Doctor Zhivago and The Sound of Music
8 nominations: Ship of Fools
5 nominations: The Agony and the Ecstasy, Cat Ballou, Darling, The Great Race, The Greatest Story Ever Told and A Patch of Blue
4 nominations: Othello, A Thousand Clowns and The Umbrellas of Cherbourg
3 nominations: The Collector and Inside Daisy Clover
2 nominations: The Flight of the Phoenix, King Rat, Morituri, The Slender Thread and The Spy Who Came In from the Cold

The following films received multiple awards.

5 wins: Doctor Zhivago and The Sound of Music
3 wins: Darling
2 wins: Ship of Fools

Presenters and performers
The following individuals, listed in order of appearance, presented awards or performed musical numbers.

Presenters

Performers

See also
23rd Golden Globe Awards
1965 in film
 8th Grammy Awards
 17th Primetime Emmy Awards
 18th Primetime Emmy Awards
 19th British Academy Film Awards
 20th Tony Awards
 List of submissions to the 38th Academy Awards for Best Foreign Language Film

References

Academy Awards ceremonies
1965 film awards
1965 awards in the United States
1966 in California
1966 in American cinema
April 1966 events in the United States
Events in Santa Monica, California
20th century in Santa Monica, California